The Leeward Island racer (Alsophis rijgersmaei) is a species of snake in the family Colubridae. The species is found in Anguilla, Saint Barthélemy, and is probably extirpated from Sint Maarten.

Taxonomy
It was named by Edward Drinker Cope in 1869, the specific name honouring the Dutch government physician in St. Maarten, Hendrik Elingsz van Rijgersma, who was an avid amateur naturalist.

Conservation
It was thought to have been eradicated by the mongoose (Westerman, 1955; Sajdak and Henderson, 1991 in Powell et al., 1992). However, in 1992 there was a report of five specimens that were captured at Mary's Fancy, and in the same year one was observed in the field (Powell et al., 1992). A snake was also seen after the hurricane in January 1996 during a field trip at Flagstaf (Ecovision/AIDEnvironment, 1996). Snakes of the genus Alsophis and Liophis prove to be more sensitive to introduced predators than other genera (Henderson, 1992). A. rijgersmaei is not rare in mongoose-free Anguilla and St. Barths, and other species of the same genus are common in other mongoose-free islands of the Lesser Antilles (even extremely abundant in some areas of Saba, Dominica and St. Eustatius), even though dogs and cats have probably been living on these islands for hundreds of years.

References

Sources
Day M (1996).  Alsophis rijgersmaei.   2006 IUCN Red List of Threatened Species.   Downloaded on 28 July 2007.
St Barth Nature .

Further reading
Cope ED (1869). "Seventh Contribution to the Herpetology of Tropical America". Proc. American Philosoph. Soc. 11 (81): 147-192. (Alsophis rijgersmaei, new species, pp. 154–155).
Schwartz A, Thomas R (1975). A Checklist of West Indian Amphibians and Reptiles. Carnegie Museum of Natural History Special Publication No. 1. Pittsburgh, Pennsylvania: Carnegie Museum of Natural History. 216 pp.  ("Alsophis rijersmai [sic]", p. 173).

Alsophis
Reptiles of the Caribbean
Reptiles described in 1869
Taxa named by Edward Drinker Cope
Taxonomy articles created by Polbot